The Deutscher Fernsehpreis (German Television Award) is an annual German award for television programming, created in 1999, by German television channels Das Erste, ZDF, RTL and Sat.1. It was created to be an equivalent to the Emmy Awards, though it is not organized by an academy. The Fernsehpreis is the successor to both the Telestar (Das Erste and ZDF) and the Goldener Löwe (RTL) awards.

History 
The first award took place on 2 October 1999 in Cologne. Every year another of the participating stations broadcast the ceremony:

Notes

References

External links
Official website

German television awards
Awards established in 1999
1999 establishments in Germany
ZDF
ARD (broadcaster)
RTL Group
ProSiebenSat.1 Media
Sat.1